2CBCB-NBOMe (NBOMe-TCB-2) is a compound indirectly derived from the phenethylamine series of hallucinogens, which was discovered in 2007 at Purdue University as part of the ongoing research program of the team led by David Nichols focusing on the mapping of the specific amino acid residues responsible for ligand binding to the 5HT2A receptor. 2CBCB-NBOMe acts as a potent and selective agonist for the 5-HT2A and 5-HT2C receptors, with a Ki of 0.27 nM at the human 5-HT2A receptor, a similar potency to other agonists such as TCB-2, NBOMe-2C-I and Bromo-DragonFLY.

Analogues and derivatives

Legality

United Kingdom

United States
2CBCB-NBOMe is a controlled substance in Vermont as of January 2016.

References

5-HT2A agonists
5-HT2C agonists
25-NB (psychedelics)
Benzocyclobutenes
Bromoarenes
Designer drugs
Psychedelic drugs